MIBOR may refer to:

MIBOR (Mumbai Inter-Bank Offer Rate)
MIBOR (Moscow Inter-Bank Offer Rate)
MIBOR (Madrid Inter-Bank Offer Rate)